Julien Marie Cosmao-Kerjulien (Châteaulin, Finistère, 27 November 1761 – Brest, 17 February 1825) was a French Navy officer, admiral, best remembered for his role in the  Battle of Trafalgar.

Career

Early career 
Completing his studies in Châteaulin, young Cosmao-Kerjulien joined the French Royal Navy in 1776, against his parents' will. He served in the Aigrette in the Caraibs. Back to Brest in 1778, he served on the Oiseau with Corentin de Leissegues. In September, after the beginning of the American Revolutionary War, he served on the Nymphe, taking part in two battles against English privateers, near Bordeaux and Belle-Isle.

Between January 1779 and April 1781, he served in Guyana aboard the brig Hirondelle, fighting two more English privateers and capturing two East Indiamen. He was promoted to Lieutenant of an auxiliary frigate in September 1781. He served successively aboard the Pégase (February 1782) and the Protecteur (March) before taking command of the Fluyt Fidèle in Terre Neuve from May 1783 to April 1784. In January 1785 he served on the Lourde, on the Vigilante  on October and the Dorade in April 1786. He was made a sub-lieutenant on a ship of the line in March 1786.

In September 1787, he was given command of the brig Vaneau, and of the  Boulonnaise for November 1787 to March 1790. From October 1790 to January 1791, he was first officer aboard the Précieuse.

From February 1791, he served aboard the Orion of the squadron of Laurent Jean François Truguet in Toulon. He was made ship of the line full lieutenant in January 1792, and received command of the corvette Sincère in April. He took part in the landing at Cagliari in January 1793.

Captain 

In December 1794 he was transferred to the squadron commanded by Admiral Pierre Martin, where he commanded the 80-gun ship of the line . On 10 June 1795, he captured the English frigate Alceste, and took part in the Battle of Cape Noli in March 1795 (the French and the English both lost two ships of the line) and of Cape Frejus (17 French ships of the line against 23 English; the French lost the 74-gun Alcide).

In June 1797, he was made chief of division, commanding the Jemmapes in the Mediterranean.

Back to France, he assumed command of the 74-gun Pluton in the squadron of Admiral Villeneuve in Toulon. Back to Europe, he took part in the Battle of Cape Finisterre, on 22 July, saving one Spanish ship which had been cut off for a time by the British.

Battle of Trafalgar 
At the Battle of Trafalgar, Pluton was part of the reconnaissance squadron created by Villeneuve and commanded by Spanish Admiral Gravina. She engaged , already damaged by the fire of Fougueux; again another English ship, forced her to disengage. She then helped the surrounded  of Gravina, and succeeded in freeing her.

However, at this point, the battle was already lost for the French. On 23 October, Cosmao, as one of the most senior officers present, jointly took command of the squadron with Spanish Commodore Enrique MacDonell, and set back to sea with five ships: Pluton, Héros, Neptune, San Francisco de Asis, and Rayo. Cosmao later tried to claim sole credit for the sortie but this is not correct as both MacDonell and Cosmao both had Commodore pennants raised. He managed to retake Neptuno and Santa Ana, as well as to force the English to scuttle a number of their prizes. Neptuno and Rayo sank during the journey back and the Indomptable was wrecked with the loss of over a thousand men.

Late career 
Cosmao-Kerjulien was made Rear Admiral on 29 May 1806. He took command of a division of the French Mediterranean Fleet, under Ganteaume from 1807. he took part in operations to resupply Corfu and to the landing in Sicily. His 4 ships, having sustained damage, retreated to Taranto.

In late 1809, Ganteaume was organising reinforcements to Barcelona. The fleet departed Toulon on 24 April 1809, and returned on 1 May without incident.

Cosmao was made baron in 1810. In August 1811, he served under Admiral Missiessy in the Escaut Squadron, commanding a division, with his flag in the ship-of-the-line Tilsit.

At the action of 5 November 1813, he saved the 74-gun  and the frigates Pénélope and Melpomène which were under threat to be surrounded by superior English forces.

In February 1814, he set sail with three ships from Toulon to Genoa, threatened by the Austrians, to bring back the Scorpion.

During the First Restoration, in April 1814, Cosmao-Kerjulien received command of the Mediterranean Fleet, and was appointed a Knight of the Order of Saint Louis. In 1815, upon the Emperor's brief return to power, he rallied to Napoleon, who made him préfet maritime of Brest in March, and a Peer of France in June, right before the Battle of Waterloo.

Cosmao-Kerjulien was retired on 1 January 1816, and for one year he did not receive a pension.  At the time of his retirement, he was 55, with 25 year in campaigns, and 11 battles without once being wounded or captured. He died at 64, on 17 February 1825.

Five paintings of him can be seen in the town house of his home town of Châteaulin, in the Finistère.

Honours 

"The best sailor of the time; none was ever braver and more generous" -- Napoléon

 Cosmao's name is engraved on the Arc de Triomphe in Paris.
 Legion of Honour from 7 April 1812
 chevalier de Saint-Louis from 5 July 1814
 Pair de France

References

External links 
 Cosmao Dumanoir
 Biographie des célébrités militaires des armées de terre et de mer de 1789 à 1850

1761 births
1825 deaths
People from Châteaulin
French Navy admirals
French naval commanders of the Napoleonic Wars
Recipients of the Legion of Honour
Knights of the Order of Saint Louis
Peers of France
Names inscribed under the Arc de Triomphe